{{DISPLAYTITLE:C25H40N7O19P3S}}
The molecular formula C25H40N7O19P3S (molar mass: 867.607 g/mol) may refer to:

 Methylmalonyl-CoA
 Succinyl-CoA

Molecular formulas